Neem Karoli Baba or Neeb Karori Baba ( – 11 September 1973), also known to his followers as 'Maharaj-ji', was a Hindu guru and a devotee of the Hindu deity Hanuman. He is known outside India for being the spiritual master of a number of Americans who travelled to India in the 1960s and 70s, the most well-known being the spiritual teachers Ram Dass and Bhagavan Das, and the musicians Krishna Das and Jai Uttal. His ashrams are in Kainchi, Vrindavan, Rishikesh, Shimla, Neem Karoli village near Khimasepur in Farrukhabad, Bhumiadhar, Hanumangarhi, and Delhi in India and in Taos, New Mexico, United States.

Biography

Early years
Lakshman Narayan Sharma was born around 1900 in the village Akbarpur in Firozabad district of Uttar Pradesh, India, to a wealthy Brahmin family. After being married by his parents at the age of 11, he left home to become a wandering sadhu. He later returned home, at his father's request, to live a settled married life. He fathered two sons and a daughter.

As Maharaj-ji
Neem Karoli Baba, known at the time as Baba Lakshman Das (also spelled "Laxman Das"), left his home in 1958. Ram Dass tells a story that Baba Lakshman Das boarded a train without a ticket and the conductor decided to halt the train and force Neem Karoli Baba off of the train at the village of Neem Karoli, Farrukhabad district (U.P). After forcing Baba off the train, the conductor found that the train would not start again. After several attempts at starting the train, someone suggested to the conductor that they allow the sadhu back on to the train.  Neem Karoli agreed to board the train on two conditions: 1) the railway company promise to build a station at the village of Neem Karoli (at the time the villagers had to walk many miles to the nearest station), and 2) the railway company must henceforth treat sadhus better.  The officials agreed and Neem Karoli Baba boarded the train joking, "What, is it up to me to start trains?"  Immediately after his boarding the train, it started, but the train drivers would not proceed unless the sadhu blessed them to move forward. Baba gave his blessings and the train proceeded. Later a train station was built at the village of Neem Karoli. Baba lived in the village of Neem Karoli for a while and was named by locals.

Thereafter he wandered extensively throughout Northern India. During this time he was known under many names, including: Lakshman Das, Handi Wallah Baba, and Tikonia Walla Baba. When he did tapasya and sadhana at Vavania village of Morbi in Gujarat, he was known as Tallaiya Baba. In Vrindavan, local inhabitants addressed him by the name of Chamatkari Baba ("miracle baba"). During his life two main ashrams were built, at Kainchi and at Vrindavan. In time, over 100 temples were constructed in his name.

The Kainchi Dham ashram, where he stayed in the last decade of his life, was built in 1964 with a Hanuman temple. It started two years prior with a modest platform built for two local sadhus, Premi Baba and Sombari Maharaj to perform yagnas. Over the years the temple, situated 17 km from Nainital on the Nainital-Almora road, has become an important pilgrimage for locals, as well as spiritual seekers and devotees worldwide. Each year on June 15, the Kainchi Dham Bhandara takes place to commemorate the inauguration of the temple, a celebration that typically receives over a lakh (100,000) of devotees.

Death

Neem Karoli Baba died at approximately 1:15 AM in the early morning hours of September 11, 1973 in a hospital at Vrindavan, India after slipping into a diabetic coma. He had been returning by night train to Kainchi near Nainital, from Agra where he had visited a heart specialist due to experiencing pains in his chest. He and his traveling companions had disembarked at Mathura railway station where he began convulsing and requested being taken to Shri Dham Vrindavan.

His samadhi shrine was built within the complex of the Vrindavan ashram, which also has some of his personal belongings.

Philosophy
Neem Karoli Baba was a lifelong adept of bhakti yoga, and encouraged service to others (seva) as the highest form of unconditional devotion to God. In the book Miracle of Love, compiled by Ram Dass, a devotee named Anjani shares the following account:

Baba would say that attachment and ego are the greatest hindrances to the realisation of God and that “a learned man and a fool are alike as long as there is attachment and ego in the physical body.” He would advise people to surrender to God's will above everything else so that they might develop love and faith in him and thereby be free of unnecessary worries in life.

Notable disciples

Notable disciples of Neem Karoli Baba include spiritual teacher Ram Dass (author of Be Here Now), singer and spiritual teacher Bhagavan Das, author and meditation teacher Lama Surya Das and the musicians Jai Uttal and Krishna Das. Other notable devotees include humanitarian Larry Brilliant and his wife Girija, Dada Mukerjee (former professor at Allahabad University, Uttar Pradesh, India), scholar and writer Yvette Rosser, American spiritual teacher Ma Jaya Sati Bhagavati, John Bush filmmaker, and Daniel Goleman author of The Varieties of the Meditative Experience and Emotional Intelligence. Baba Hari Dass (Haridas) was not a disciple, but he supervised several buildings and maintained the ashrams in the Nainital area (1954-1968) before heading to the US to become a spiritual teacher in California at the beginning of 1971.

Steve Jobs, along with his friend Dan Kottke, traveled to India in April 1974 to study Hinduism and Indian spirituality; they planned also to meet Neem Karoli Baba, but arrived to find the guru had died the previous September. Hollywood actress Julia Roberts was also influenced by Neem Karoli Baba. A picture of him drew Roberts to Hinduism. Influenced by Steve Jobs, Mark Zuckerberg visited Neem Karoli Baba's ashram in Kainchi. Larry Brilliant took Google's Larry Page and Jeffrey Skoll, co-founder of eBay, on the pilgrimage.

Foundations
After returning to the United States, Ram Dass and Larry Brilliant founded the Seva Foundation, an international health organization based in Berkeley, California. Steve Jobs, a friend of Brilliant, also funded the organization. It is committed to applying the teachings of Neem Karoli Baba toward preventing and treating blindness.

In the late 2000s another Foundation evolved, the 'Love Serve Remember Foundation', whose purpose is to preserve and continue the teachings of Neem Karoli Baba.

Documentary 
The 2021 documentary Windfall of Grace offers an engaging blend of narratives from simple, rustic Indian devotees juxtaposed by narratives of renowned American devotees. These expressions seek to bring out not just the contrasts but also the similarities between the two by way of their overwhelming love and surrender for Neem Karoli Baba. Their individual encounters with Baba sparked dramatic shifts in their life purpose along with their spiritual path and practice.

Gallery

References

Bibliography

External links

1900 births
1973 deaths
20th-century Hindu religious leaders
20th-century Indian philosophers
Hindu mystics
Indian Hindu saints
Indian Hindu spiritual teachers
Indian yoga teachers
People from Mathura
People from British India
Ram Dass
Vaishnavite religious leaders
Deaths from diabetes
Deaths from multiple organ failure